Vladimír Cifranič (born 10 January 1975) is a former Slovak football defender and manager who currently manages Púchov.

Coaching career
In September 2013, Cifranič was appointed as the assistant manager of AS Trenčín under manager Martin Ševela. On 12 September 2017, manager Martin Ševela was fired and Cifranič took over his position together with Roman Marčok. In the summer 2018, the club hired Ricardo Moniz as the new manager, with Cifranič under him as his assistant. Moniz re-signed already after 3 months, and Cifranič was once again appointed as the new manager on 29 October 2018. After his own request, Cifranič resigned on 20 March 2019.

External links
AS Trenčín official club profile

Futbalnet profile

References

1975 births
Living people
Slovak footballers
Slovak expatriate footballers
Slovak football managers
Association football defenders
FC VSS Košice players
AS Trenčín players
AC Sparta Prague players
ŠK Slovan Bratislava players
Odra Wodzisław Śląski players
FC ViOn Zlaté Moravce players
MFK Zemplín Michalovce players
FK Slavoj Trebišov players
OŠK Trenčianske Stankovce players
ŠK LR Crystal Lednické Rovne players
AS Trenčín managers
MŠK Púchov managers
FK Železiarne Podbrezová managers
Slovak Super Liga players
Czech First League players
Ekstraklasa players
Slovak Super Liga managers
2. Liga (Slovakia) managers
Expatriate footballers in the Czech Republic
Slovak expatriate sportspeople in the Czech Republic
Expatriate footballers in Poland
Slovak expatriate sportspeople in Poland